Paul McGrillen (19 August 1971 – 29 July 2009) was a Scottish footballer who played as a striker for clubs including Motherwell, Falkirk, Airdrieonians and East Fife in the Scottish leagues. After retiring from senior football, he played in the Scottish minor leagues and was playing for Bathgate Thistle as this level when he killed himself in July 2009, when aged 37.

Career
McGrillen spent his early career with Motherwell, being part of Motherwell's Scottish Cup-winning squad in 1991 (although not appearing in the Final itself), while also winning the Scottish Challenge Cup with Falkirk in 1997–98. Following his departure from Brockville in 1998, McGrillen began a series of spells with lower league clubs, taking up a player/manager role with Bellshill Athletic between 2006 and 2007. In 2008, McGrillen won the Scottish Junior Cup with his final club Bathgate.

On 11 September 2008, McGrillen played for a Motherwell side in Dougie Arnott's belated testimonial match against an Old Firm select.

Death
McGrillen was found dead at his home in Hamilton on 29 July 2009, as a result of suicide by hanging, but without leaving a note.

Honours
Motherwell
Scottish Cup: 1
 1990–91

Falkirk
Scottish Challenge Cup: 1
 1997–98

Bathgate
Scottish Junior Cup: 1
 2007–08

References

External links

1971 births
2009 suicides
Footballers from Glasgow
Scottish footballers
Scottish Football League players
Motherwell F.C. players
Falkirk F.C. players
Airdrieonians F.C. (1878) players
East Fife F.C. players
Stirling Albion F.C. players
Partick Thistle F.C. players
Clydebank F.C. (1965) players
Stenhousemuir F.C. players
Bathgate Thistle F.C. players
Stranraer F.C. players
Scottish Junior Football Association players
Bellshill Athletic F.C. players
Scotland under-21 international footballers
Suicides by hanging in Scotland
Association football forwards
Footballers from Hamilton, South Lanarkshire
2009 deaths